Leptosiropsis is a genus of green algae in the family Chaetophoraceae.

References

External links

Chaetophorales genera
Chaetophoraceae